Lowell Bergman (born July 24, 1945) is an American journalist, television producer and professor of journalism. In a career spanning nearly five decades Bergman worked as a producer, a reporter, and then the director of investigative reporting at ABC News and as a producer for CBS's 60 Minutes, leaving in 1998 as the senior producer of investigations for CBS News. He also was the founder of the investigative reporting program at the Graduate School of Journalism at UC Berkeley and for 28 years taught there as professor. He was also a producer/correspondent for the PBS documentary series Frontline. In 2019, Bergman retired.

The story of his investigation into the tobacco industry was chronicled in Michael Mann’s The Insider, which was nominated for seven Academy Awards. Bergman was portrayed by Al Pacino. From 1999 to 2008, Bergman was an investigative correspondent for The New York Times. He forged a partnership between The Times and PBS Frontline in 1999 creating collaborative investigative projects using broadcast, print and the Web. Bergman has received honors for both print and broadcasting, including the Pulitzer Prize for Public Service, awarded to The New York Times in 2004 for "A Dangerous Business" which detailed a record of worker safety violations coupled with the systematic violation of environmental laws in the cast-iron sewer and water pipe industry. That story is the only winner of the Pulitzer Prize to also be acknowledged with every major award in broadcasting. 

The recipient of numerous Emmys, Bergman has also been honored with six Alfred I. duPont-Columbia University Silver and Golden Baton awards, three Peabodys, two Harvard Goldsmith Awards for Investigative Reporting, a Polk Award, the RFK Grand Prize, a Sidney Hillman Award for Labor Reporting, a Bart Richards Award for Media Criticism, the National Press Club’s Arthur Rowse Award for Press Criticism, a Mirror Award from the S.I. Newhouse School of Public Communications at Syracuse University, and the James Madison Freedom of Information Award for Career Achievement from the Society of Professional Journalists. 

Bergman was named one of the 30 most notable investigative reporters in the United States, according to Christopher H. Sterling’s six-volume Encyclopedia of Journalism.

Through the non-profit production company, Investigative Studios, he has continued to work on documentaries and documentary series serving as Co-Executive Producer with Brian Knappenberger on Netflix’s The Trials of Gabriel Fernandez and as Executive Producer and reporter on Agents of Chaos, a co-production with Alex Gibney’s Jigsaw Productions, and is currently at work on a number of documentary series and a book.

Early life and career 
Bergman's grandmother was the first secretary-treasurer of a ILGWU local in New York; his grandfather was also a founder. His father, Alex Bergman, emigrated to the U.S. from Hungary via Cuba in 1938. His mother was born in the United States and had a career in the fashion industry, taught gourmet cooking and then managed 48 apartment units in Mt. Vernon, NY until she died at 101 in 2019. 

Bergman graduated from the University of Wisconsin–Madison, with Honors, in Sociology and History, and was a graduate fellow in philosophy at the University of California, San Diego, where he studied under Herbert Marcuse. In 1969, he co-founded San Diego Free Press (later San Diego Street Journal), an alternative newspaper, with several fellow students.  Bergman and others including a former UCSD undergraduate student Richard "Black Dick" Blackburn instigated the probe which later toppled the San Diego financial empire of C. Arnholt Smith, president and chief executive officer of U.S. National Bank in San Diego. Bergman went on to contribute to Ramparts and The San Francisco Examiner.  He later worked as an associate editor at Rolling Stone and as a correspondent for The New York times from 1999 to 2008. His work for The New York Times included guiding its first documentary partnerships with PBS' Frontline, covering the energy crisis in California in print and film along with coverage of Al Qaeda both before and after 9/11. Those films and print coverage garnered numerous awards. 

In 1977, Bergman helped found the Center for Investigative Reporting.  He was part of the reporting team that continued the work of Arizona Republic reporter Don Bolles, who was assassinated in 1976 while investigating land fraud committed by organized crime.

Television career 
From 1978 until 1983, Bergman was a producer, reporter and then in charge of investigative reporting at ABC News. He was one of the original producers of 20/20. In 1983, Bergman joined CBS News as a producer for the weekly newsmagazine 60 Minutes and its lead correspondent, Mike Wallace. Over the course of 14 years, he produced more than 50 stories, ranging from exposes of organized crime, international arms dealing featuring Sarkis Soghanalian, then the world's main supplier to Saddam Hussein, and others to international drug trafficking in Venezuela involving the CIA to the Iran-Iraq and Persian Gulf wars. His five stories on California's then expanding prison system including the super max at Pelican Bay revealed everything from the horrors of solitary confinement to the staging of "gladiator" matches by its correctional officers. He also produced the first U.S. television interviews with Lebanon's Hezbollah leadership in the early 1990s, when they were considered the world's most dangerous terrorists.

The story of Bergman's investigation of the tobacco industry for 60 Minutes was chronicled in the 1999 feature film The Insider, in which Bergman was played by Al Pacino. The success of the film and its allegedly negative characterization of 60 Minutes correspondent Mike Wallace and producer Don Hewitt, led to Bergman's virtual blacklisting from the show, according to Bergman himself.

Reporting across multiple platforms 
An early adopter and advocate of the multimedia model, Bergman forged an alliance between The New York Times and Frontline after leaving network news in the late 1990s. The collaboration resulted in a series of stories including California's energy crisis; the country's war on drugs; the rise of Islamic fundamentalism; the roots of 9/11; the credit card and gold industries; the post-9/11 hunt for "sleeper cells" in America; and Al Qaeda's recent attacks in Europe. It also yielded a number of award-winning projects—all with print, broadcast, and online components.  Extensive web sites prepared in large part by students in Bergman's seminar have accompanied many of these projects, i.e.: "Secret History of the Credit Card", "Al Qaeda's New Front", "The Enemy Within", "The Real CSI" and "News War". Drawing on more than 80 interviews with key figures in the print, broadcast and electronic media, and with unequaled, behind-the-scenes access to some of today's most important news organizations, "News War" examined the challenges facing the mainstream news media and the media's reaction. The Poynter Institute has called these sites a “prime example of what many who touted "convergence journalism" hoped might happen—journalism that leverages the strengths of each media to tell a more complete story than any one media could tell on its own.”

Collaborating with other New York Times reporters, Bergman helped produce a series of in-depth articles detailing the financial arrangements between Vice President Dick Cheney and Halliburton, both before and after his retirement as chief executive officer of that firm to re-enter politics.

Awards and honors 
Bergman has received top honors in both print and broadcasting. The New York Times won the 2004 Pulitzer Prize for Public Service, citing "the work of David Barstow and Lowell Bergman that relentlessly examined death and injury among American workers and exposed employers who break basic safety rules." The series, "A Dangerous Business", detailed a record of egregious worker safety violations coupled with the systematic violation of environmental laws in the iron sewer and water pipe industry. That story, which appeared as both a print series and a documentary, is the only winner of the Pulitzer Prize also to be acknowledged with every major award in broadcasting. In May 2006, Bergman was named the Reva and David Logan Distinguished Professor at the University of California, Berkeley's Graduate School of Journalism.

He is the recipient of numerous Emmys and other honors including six Alfred I. duPont-Columbia University silver and golden awards, three Peabodys, a Writers Guild Award, the National Press Club's Consumer Journalism Award for Television on the credit card industry, a George Polk Award, a Sidney Hillman award for labor reporting, and the James Madison Freedom of Information Award for Career Achievement from the Society of Professional Journalists.

Academic highlights 
In addition to being a mentor to a generation of journalists from around the world, working with and directing them on major investigations, Bergman also serves as the conduit between student projects and their publication in some of the country’s top media outlets. Projects produced out of his investigative reporting seminars at the Graduate School of Journalism at the University of California, Berkeley have reached mass audiences and have had significant impact, appearing on national television, including PBS' Frontline and Frontline/World, as well as ABC's '20/20', Nightline, CBS Evening News, and 60 Minutes II; and in print, where students have been the primary authors or contributors of stories that have appeared in the pages of The New York Times, Los Angeles Times, "The Washington Post", and San Francisco Chronicle, as well as a wide variety of magazines, The Atlantic, and international and local newspapers.  This work, especially in recent years, demonstrated that investigative reporting written and produced by students – and guided by veteran reporters – can help raise the standards of journalism nationally. Bergman also helps in securing financial support from both private donors and foundations for travel and research expenses that facilitate the students’ work.

In addition to being the first President of the Center for Investing Reporting in 1997, he was a consultant involved in the creation of Pro Publica thirty years later as well as being founder of the Investigative Reporting Program {IRP} at UC Berkeley in 2006. His served as Executive Director and Chairman of the Board of the then UC, Berkeley affiliated Investigative Studios, a non profit production company until late 2019. Investigative Studios and the IRP helped support Russian journalists in the creation of an independent newsroom, The Bell,  on the ground in Moscow. 

In May 2007, Bergman established three annual Fellowships in Investigative Reporting at UC Berkeley. This year-long program is without peer at any academic institution in the nation and is designed to nurture young journalists who want to pursue a career in in-depth public service reporting by providing them with a salary, benefits and editorial guidance. "With the economics of major news organizations deteriorating," said Bergman, "this kind of public interest journalism involving time-consuming investigative work is endangered as never before. These fellowships will provide both a refuge and a base of operations for a new generation of investigative reporters. The program had is last group of fellows in residence through 2020. "

 Interviews 
 "Smoke In The Eye: a Talk With Lowell Bergman", PBS Frontline (1999).  "There's a major difference between All The President's Men and The Insider", Lowell Bergman has said of the comparison between the 1976 film on Watergate and Hollywood's new version of the events depicted in Frontline's report, "Smoke in the Eye". "In All the President's Men, the editors and reporters are heroes. That's not the case here."
 "Long March through the Institution" of Television Journalism; Conversation with Lowell Bergman. Part of the "Conversations with History" series, Institute of International Studies, UC Berkeley with Harry Kreisler, (2001)
 On September 27, 2006, Bergman appeared on The Colbert Report.
 On February 27, 2007, Bergman was interviewed by Terry Gross of WHYY's Fresh Air about the Frontline documentary "News War: Secrets, Spin and the Future of the News." The four-part series, which Bergman co-produced, is about the mainstream news media and the political, legal and economic forces acting on it. The third installment looks at how the pressure for profits and shifting advertising dollars are affecting the news business.
 On February 27, 2007, Bergman was interviewed for the What's happening to the news? segment by Marketplace's Kai Ryssdal about how the Internet has changed journalism.
 On June 11, 2007, Bergman was interviewed by George Stroumboulopoulos for CBC Television's news magazine, The Hour''.
 On January 26, 2009, Bergman discussed Halliburton's record $560 million settlement with the Justice Department and the SEC for violations of the Foreign Corrupt Practices Act with NPR's All Things Considered. Bergman's documentary on bribery in international commerce will air on PBS "Frontline" Frontline/World: The Business of Bribes | PBS April 7, 2009.

References

External links 

 Lowell Bergman's home page at the UC Berkeley Graduate School of Journalism.
 CNN on The Insider, (November 1999).
 A chronology of the 60 Minutes decision not to air the tobacco industry exposé. (1999).
 
 

American investigative journalists
American journalism academics
University of California, Berkeley Graduate School of Journalism faculty
The New York Times writers
Television producers from California
University of California, San Diego alumni
University of Wisconsin–Madison College of Letters and Science alumni
People from Madison, Wisconsin
1945 births
Living people
Television producers from New York City
60 Minutes producers